Morroa is a town and municipality located in the Sucre Department, northern Colombia.

References
 Gobernacion de Sucre - Morroa
 Morroa official website

Sucre